Brian Hines (born October 7, 1948) is an American writer and land use activist who fights development of farm and forest land in Oregon.

In 1971, Hines became a member of Radha Soami Satsang Beas, a spiritual organization Radha Soami Satsang Beas. He later became critical of the organization, and after spending some time in Dharamsala now he practices Samatha-vipassana meditation.

He earned a degree in psychology from San Jose State University in 1971, and a Master's in Social Work from Portland State University in 1973. Hines completed course requirements for a Ph.D. in Systems Science at PSU from 1974–77. He worked in health policy and planning from 1973 to 1988: four years as a research associate at University of Oregon Health Sciences Center and six years as a manager at the State Health Planning and Development Agency. Hines was a co-founder and executive director of Oregon Health Decisions, a citizen network on education and action on bioethical issues.

Actor Shahid Kapoor credits Hines' book Life is Fair for influencing Kapoor's choice to practice vegetarianism.

Hines lives currently in Salem, Oregon with his wife, Laurel.

Bibliography
 Hines, Brian. God’s Whisper, Creation’s Thunder  is a study of how ancient mysteries relates to the new physics.
 Hines, Brian. Science, Spirit, and the Wisdom of Not-Knowing is a 24-page essay that also explores how science and spirituality relate.
 Hines, Brian. Life is Fair ASIN B000CBCXP2 is a modern discussion of karma, complete with cartoons, and why vegetarianism is both sensible and moral. 
 Hines, Brian. Return to the One  is an exposition of the teachings of Plotinus, a Greek mystic philosopher.
 Hines, Brian. Break Free of Dogma: Churchless sermons preaching the gospel of spiritual independence .

References

External links
 Brian's website
 Brian Hines' blog called Church of the Churchless.
 Oregon Health Decisions
 Article in the Journal of the American Medical Association
 Article in DNA India

1948 births
American male bloggers
American bloggers
American skeptics
American social workers
American spiritual writers
American environmentalists
Living people
Social workers
Portland State University alumni
Writers from Salem, Oregon
21st-century American non-fiction writers